Tamara Ivanovna Manina (born 16 September 1934) is a retired Soviet Olympic gymnast and a sports scientist.

Biography
Her family lived in Petersburg (and later in Leningrad), but Manina was born in Petrozavodsk, where her father was on a long mission. During the German-Soviet War she was evacuated from besieged Leningrad into Tashkent. She returned into Leningrad in 1944 and began gymnastics at the Leningrad Young Pioneer Palace in the same year. She was called "Monia the Bird" by groupmates for her graceful and light vaults.

Competing as a junior, she won the all-around title at the USSR Nationals in 1953, and became a candidate for the USSR team. In the same year Manina debuted at the senior USSR Championships, placing 12th in the all-around. Between 1953 and 1964 Manina successfully competed in many national and international events.

One of Manina's most successful performances took place at the 1954 World Artistic Gymnastics Championships, where she earned several gold medals on vault, on the floor and in the team competition. At the 1956 Olympics she rivalled Ágnes Keleti, Larisa Latynina, and other strong competitors, and placed 6th in the all-around, but won silver medals on vault and balance beam. She also contributed to the team's gold and bronze medals. The USSR team won more gold medals than any other country at that year's Olympics. In one of her interviews Manina said, that the team had a warm welcome everywhere in the USSR: on their way by train from Vladivostok to Moscow they were met with flowers on each small station, people organized solemn meetings and made other arrangements to honor their visit.

Although in the event finals of the 1958 Worlds Manina, apart from the gold in the team competition, won a silver medal, on vault, she placed 3rd in the all-around to Latynina and Eva Bosáková. She missed the 1960 Summer Olympics due to an injury, but competed in the 1962 World Artistic Gymnastics Championships, contributing to the team's gold and winning the bronze on vault. At age 30 she went to the 1964 Summer Olympics and won the team's gold and silver on the balance beam. Finishing her competitive career, Manina seriously injured her ankle during the display competition in Vienna and was not able to continue training afterward. She coached the French national team in 1975 and has been an international judge since 1971.

Manina is also known for her scientific activities. Starting in 1958, she studied at the Leningrad State Institute of Fine Mechanics and Optics, and graduated in 1965.  She defended a dissertation for the Candidate of Science degree at the Lesgaft State Institute of Physical Culture in 1969 and taught at the gymnastics department of the institute until 1973. Since 1975 she has been a professor at the Saint Petersburg State Art-Industrial Academy. She has published more than 40 scientific, methodical and popular science books.

Tamara Manina lives and works in Saint Petersburg. She is married to Valery Lutkov, a sports medicine doctor, and has a son.

See also

List of top Olympic gymnastics medalists
List of top medalists at the World Artistic Gymnastics Championships
List of Olympic female gymnasts for the Soviet Union

References

External links

 

1934 births
Living people
People from Petrozavodsk
Soviet female artistic gymnasts
Gymnasts at the 1956 Summer Olympics
Gymnasts at the 1964 Summer Olympics
Olympic bronze medalists for the Soviet Union
Olympic gold medalists for the Soviet Union
Olympic silver medalists for the Soviet Union
Olympic gymnasts of the Soviet Union
Olympic medalists in gymnastics
World champion gymnasts
Medalists at the World Artistic Gymnastics Championships
Burevestnik (sports society) athletes
Sports scientists
Medalists at the 1964 Summer Olympics
Medalists at the 1956 Summer Olympics
Universiade medalists in gymnastics
Universiade bronze medalists for the Soviet Union
Medalists at the 1961 Summer Universiade